Lake Llacsacocha (possibly from Quechua llaksa puna teal (Anas puna); fearful; melting of metals; metal; bronze; a small ceremonial collar, qucha lake) is a lake in Peru located in the Junín Region, Jauja Province, Canchayllo District. It lies northeast of a lake with the same name, southwest of Chalhuacocha and west of Mancacocha.

References 

Lakes of Peru
Lakes of Junín Region